Voerbelangen is a local political party from the Belgian municipality Voeren. The party has 10 seats of a total of 15 in the city council. Since 2001 is Huub Broers the mayor of Voeren.

External links 
 

Flemish political parties in Belgium
Political parties established in 1976
Voeren